Lavezares, officially the Municipality of Lavezares, is a 4th class municipality in the province of Northern Samar, Philippines. According to the 2020 census, it has a population of 29,390 people.

It is bounded on the west by the municipality of Allen, on the north-west by San Bernardino Strait, on the south and south-west by the municipality of Victoria, on the east by the municipality of Rosario and on the north by the municipality of Biri.

History
Lavezares was just a visita during the late 19th century. In this period of time, Barobaybay, Villa and MacArthur served as the oldest pueblos of the old municipality.

During the Spanish period, Lavezares was controlled by secular priests. It was named in honor of the Spanish Governor-General Guido de Lavezares who helped them become separated from the Municipality of Allen, and be an independent municipality. Sitios of Lavezares including Caburihan, Ocad, Caragas, Cataogan and Sabang-Tabok were converted into barangays though Republic Act 2370 (the Barrio Charter Act) and Republic Act 3590 (the Revised Barrio Charter Act). And shortly, the municipality was administered by the capitanes, presidentes and municipal mayors.

Geography
Technically, there are only two hills in the area, these are located in the southernmost part of Barangays Chansvilla and Toog. No mountain can be found in the area.

There are also no major plains but a few flat lands that not very extensive. The coastal areas of Lavezares are limited and have generally moderately terrain. Bacolods which serve as natural breakwater on different coasts of the municipality can be found along the coasts of Barangays Balicuatro, Villa, Bani and Magsaysay among others. They are protected as part of the Biri Larosa Protected Landscape and Seascape.

Land reclamation in different parts of the municipality particularly in island barangays of San Juan, San Isdro, Magsaysay and Bani is continuously being done. The coastal barangays along the mainland are similarly reclaiming lands which include the coasts of Barangays Libas, Cataogan, Sabang-Tabok, Urdaneta and Barobaybay.

Climate

Barangays
Lavezares is politically subdivided into 26 barangays, 12 of which are considered as inland barangays and 14 coastal barangays, which can be subclassified into 5 island barangays and 9 barangays situated along the coast of the mainland.

Inland barangays:

Coastal barangays:

The smallest barangay is Cataogan, while the largest is Bani. According to the Provincial Physical Framework Plan of 2004–2013, the municipality is suitable for irrigated rice, fish ponds, trees and crops.

The mainland is attached entirely to the entire Samar Island. Maravilla Island, San Juan Island and Bani Island are the three major islands of the municipality.

Demographics

Economy

Government
The political body of Lavezares was established in 1875 under the Spanish colonial power wherein the local executive was alluded as Capitanes. From 1903 to 1935, the persons who assumed the position were called Presidentes, and from 1936 until present where they were referred to as Municipal Mayors.

Transportation
Access to Lavezares has two options: from Manila, a fourteen to fifteen hours of bus ride with Roll-on/roll-off vessels from Matnog, Sorsogon, to the port of Allen, Northern Samar, or taking a plane to Catarman and a jeepney ride to Lavezares both serving as the main transport facility towards this portion.

Tourism
In this coastal province of Northern Samar, eco-tourism may just become an alternative income generator aside from coconuts and fishing.

True to mention are the white sand beaches abounding among its coastal and groups of island barangays that comprises the municipality though some parts have strong underwater current not suitable for a beach resort. Current white sand beach resorts are found at barangays Urdaneta and Barobaybay and waters between Bani Island and Barobaybay. The resorts offer huts along the beachfront and for overnight stays, tourist inns are available.

The coral reefs in Bancauan Island, Bani Island, Barangay Maravilla and Barangay San Juan are good for scuba diving.

The sunsets can be viewed at Lavezares Bay and Barangay Barobaybay, but Barangay Maravilla provides the most outstanding view because of the island's north to south orientation with just the vast sea on sight.

Education
Primary Schools - There are 26 barangay elementary school and one central school, Lavezares Central Elementary School.
Secondary Schools - Basilio B. Chan Memorial Agricultural and Industrial School is the only public high school in the whole municipality, which is situated at Barangay Sabang-Tabok. It is the venue where the government can provide the youth of Lavezares the needed knowledge and skills that would prepare them not only for their college life but also to the challenges of real world. Nevertheless, there are 3 private schools offering secondary courses where 2 of which are operated by religious orders: The Holy Family Center of Studies at Caburihan and Barobaybay Academy Mission School at Barobaybay. Colegio de San Juan, where located at Libertad, offers secondary and tertiary education and serves as an alternative for those who cannot afford to study outside the municipality.

References

External links
 [ Philippine Standard Geographic Code]
 Philippine Census Information
 Local Governance Performance Management System

Municipalities of Northern Samar